Rutongo is a city on the outskirts of the Kigali urban area in Rwanda.

History 

The company Rutongo Mines mined a deposit of cassiterite. In 1948, in his story The New Congo, the journalist Tom Marvel wrote about this "...beautiful mine, as Richesses of Rwanda".;

The city houses the Rutongo Major Propaedeutic Seminary.

References

Bibliography
 Approche socio-économique : secteur artisanal, Commune de Rutongo, Association de coopération et de recherche pour le développement (Rwanda), 1987, 194 p.

External links 

Kigali Province
Populated places in Rwanda